Michael W. Roberts is an American defense acquisition official who served as the first director of the Space Rapid Capabilities Office. He is the chief of government relations at The Aerospace Corporation. A member of the Senior Executive Service, he has worked for the Naval Sea Systems Command, Naval Surface Warfare Center, and Northrop Grumman.

References

External links 
 

Living people
Year of birth missing (living people)